Stephen McCole is a Scottish actor. He is best known for starring in the dark comedy series High Times, the American comedy Rushmore, and for his former role in BBC Scotland soap opera River City.

Career
In his best known role, High Times, McCole portrays Rab, an unemployed stoner who lives with his best friend in a bleak high-rise flat in Glasgow. The series, which received the 2004 BAFTA Scotland Best Drama Award, also features McCole's older brother, Paul. McCole credits the realism of his role to growing up in similar surroundings in Glasgow's Castlemilk project.

McCole also starred in the 2008 adventure comedy Stone of Destiny. He has appeared in The Young Person's Guide to Becoming a Rock Star (1998), The Acid House (1998), Postmortem (1998), Rushmore (1998) and the 2003 BBC One miniseries The Key. In 2005, he directed the short comedy film Electric Blues, written by his brother.

From 2014, he became part of the main cast of BBC Scotland soap opera "River City", playing the role of Alan Lindsay, and left in 2015.

Filmography

References

External links

Scottish male television actors
Scottish male film actors
Scottish male soap opera actors
Living people
Year of birth missing (living people)
Male actors from Glasgow